Noah George Taylor (born 4 September 1969) is an Australian actor. He is best known for his roles as teenage David Helfgott in Shine, Locke in the HBO series Game of Thrones, Darby Sabini in the BBC One series Peaky Blinders, Mr. Bucket in Charlie and the Chocolate Factory and Danny in the Australian cult film He Died with a Felafel in His Hand. Taylor also starred as Adolf Hitler in both the American television series Preacher and the 2002 film Max.

Early life

Taylor, elder of two sons, was born in London to Australian parents, Maggie (née Miller), a journalist and book editor, and Paul Taylor, a copywriter and journalist. His parents returned to Australia when he was five, and he grew up in Clifton Hill and St Kilda, suburbs of Melbourne.

After performing in plays at St Martins Youth Arts Centre in South Yarra for a year, he gained the attention of director John Duigan, who cast him in the 1987 film The Year My Voice Broke, the first part of a planned trilogy. Taylor also appeared in its sequel, Flirting (1991), alongside Thandiwe Newton with Nicole Kidman and Naomi Watts in supporting roles.

Career
Taylor's early roles included acting the lead in the critically acclaimed The Year My Voice Broke and Flirting and he gained significant international attention playing the tormented young pianist David Helfgott in the 1996 film Shine. Taylor's résumé includes action movies (Lara Croft: Tomb Raider), comedies (The Life Aquatic with Steve Zissou), psychological thrillers (Vanilla Sky and Predestination) and historical dramas (Max, in which he played the young Adolf Hitler.) He also played the role of Adolf Hitler in AMC's series Preacher.

Taylor once commented in an interview that he was sick of acting out the nostalgic reminiscences of other people. He has done this in a number of films including The Nostradamus Kid, which was based on the early life of the Australian author Bob Ellis, a young David Helfgott in Shine, the protagonist in John Birmingham's memoir He Died with a Felafel in His Hand, and Almost Famous, based on the memories of the film's writer and director, Cameron Crowe.

In 2010 Taylor starred in Simon Rumley's mystery thriller Red White & Blue, which had its world premiere as part of the SXSW Film Festival in March 2010.

Taylor has appeared in a small number of music videos. One of his earliest screen performances was in the video for Beargarden's song "The Finer Things". This video was directed by Richard Lowenstein, who then cast Taylor in a supporting role in the film [Dogs in Space]. Much later, he appeared in the video of "Fifteen Feet of Pure White Snow", a song by Nick Cave and the Bad Seeds, along with the video for "M.O.R." by British alternative rock group Blur and he also played a young Romeo in the video "Romeos" from Alphaville.

He has also performed and recorded as a musician. In 2001 he released an album Popular Music for All Peoples under the name 'C.B.M.' (Cardboard Box Man) and in 2011, an EP Live Free or Die!!! as Noah Taylor & the Sloppy Boys on Z-Man Records.

In 2013, Taylor appeared in both the third and fourth seasons of HBO's epic fantasy series Game of Thrones, based on the A Song of Ice and Fire book series by George R. R. Martin. In the adaptation, Taylor plays the character of Locke, an original character of the television series, who serves as a condensed version of several characters of the books, most notably the ruthless and sadistic mercenary leader Vargo Hoat.

Personal life

When not acting, Taylor draws and paints, and is also an accomplished musician, playing viola and French horn as a young teenager, and guitar from the age of 16. He plays the piano by ear. He has sung and played guitar in several of his own bands, including Honky Tonk Angels, Cardboard Box Man, Flipper & Humphrey, Access Axis, and The Thirteens, a country-western rock band described by Taylor as, "three manic depressives playing sad angst and western music for sad people". He names Johnny Cash and Lou Reed as two of the artists he admires.

On 14 November 2012, he married Dionne Harris, an Australian fashion designer. Taylor lives in Brighton, East Sussex.

Filmography

Film

Television

Music Video Appearances

References

External links

1969 births
Living people
British male film actors
British male television actors
20th-century Australian male actors
21st-century Australian male actors
20th-century British male actors
21st-century British male actors
English emigrants to Australia
People educated at University High School, Melbourne
Australian male film actors
Australian male television actors
Australian people of British descent
Male actors from Melbourne
Australian expatriates in England